National Fitness Hall of Fame is an American hall of fame for notable fitness professionals. It includes notable figures involved in fitness instruction, training, education, fitness management and product development. The mission is to recognize and support fitness professionals for their dedication to helping others "Get Fit and Stay Healthy" and provide programs and services that helps all individuals achieve a better level of health and fitness.

History

John Figarelli founded the National Fitness Hall of Fame on December 2, 2004 to honor individuals and organizations who had made a lifetime contribution to health and fitness. Inductees are classed as pioneers, educators, instructors, sports medicine, celebrity spokespeople, and organizations. One of the criteria for membership is at least twenty-five years of service as a full-time Health and Fitness industry professional. Figarelli formed the National Fitness Organization, a corporation, in December 2004, with his wife, mother and father. They rented a small location in Sycamore, Illinois, to hold Figarelli's collection of fitness memorabilia, which would form the nucleus of the museum.

The first class of 2005 had twelve members, including Arnold Schwarzenegger, Jack LaLanne and Charles Atlas. Other inductees included Joe Weider, Vic Tanny, Arthur Jones, Paul Bragg and Kenneth H. Cooper. The National Fitness Hall of Fame is the only institution in the nation that recognizes those individuals who pioneered the fitness industry, preservers fitness history and promotes the future of fitness in America.

The fourth class of ten members was inducted in 2008 with a dinner, silent auction and ceremony, and was attended by many of the inductees. The ceremony was held at the Oak Meadows Golf Club in Addison, Illinois, and was hosted by Gilad Janklowicz of the television show Bodies in Motion. There were about 250 attendees. Inductees included Cory Everson, Tamilee Webb, Charles Kuntzleman, Michael Thurmond and others.

In November 2014 Bill Crawford (2012 NFHOF Inductee) a fitness trainer and owner of a gym in Scottsdale, Arizona, was appointed Chairman of the National Fitness Hall of Fame and served a 3-year term ending in 2017.

Inclusive among the National Fitness Hall of Fame inductees are four elected Fellows in the National Academy of Kinesiology: Steven N. Blair, P.E.D., Fellow #302, who also served as Academy President during 1994-1995; Janice S. Todd, Ph.D., Fellow #511; Thomas K. Cureton, Ph.D., Fellow #119, who received the Academy's Highest Honor, the Hetherington Award, in 1976; and Dudley Allen Sargent, M.D., Honorary Fellow in Memoriam.

Inductees

Charles Atlas
Paul Bernstein
Joe Bonomo
Dr. Paul C. Bragg, ND
Kenneth H. Cooper
Nancy Claussen
 Bill Crawford
Debbie Drake
Clyde Emrich
Jane Fonda
Cathe Friedrich
Bob Gajda
Marilu Henner
Bob Hoffman
Gilad Janklowicz
 Kathy Kaehler
Professor Len Kravitz
Jack LaLanne
Joe Lupo
David Lyons
Tony Little
Anibal Lopez
Bernarr Macfadden
Lenda Murray
Bill Pearl
Joseph Pilates
Bonnie Prudden

 Forbes Riley
Leslie Sansone
Professor Thomas Sattler
Arnold Schwarzenegger
Richard Simmons
Kathy Smith
Vic Tanny
 Michael Thurmond
Dennis Tinerino

Terry Todd
Tamilee Webb
David P. Webster
Ben Weider
Betty Weider
Joe Weider
Dr. Robert Weil, DPM

(Complete list of NFHOF Inductees can be found at the website: www.NationalFitnessHallofFame.com)

References

Halls of fame in Illinois
Tourist attractions in Grundy County, Illinois